Paul J. Allison  is a British-Canadian clinician-scientist and oral surgeon. He is the immediate former dean of the McGill University Faculty of Dentistry and is the current president of the Canadian Academy of Health Sciences.

Early life and education
Paul Allison obtained his BDS degree from University College London in 1986 after which he completed his Oral and Maxillofacial Surgery training. In 1994 he completed an MSc in the specialty of Dental Public Health at the same institution. He completed his PhD at McGill University in 1998.

Career
He was appointed dean of the Faculty of Dentistry at McGill in 2008, a position he held until 2018. In 2019, he was one of 27 research, policy, advocacy & clinical dentistry experts globally and one of two Canadians on the landmark Lancet Commission on Oral Health.

He previously held the position of President of the Association of Canadian Faculties of Dentistry (ACFD) from 2015-2020.

Awards
He received the Queen Elizabeth II Diamond Jubilee Medal in 2013 recognizing his contributions to Canadian society.

He was one of six top Canadian health researchers to be appointed to the Governing Council of the Canadian Institutes of Health Research (CIHR) in 2018.

References

External links
 cihr-irsc.gc.ca
 mcgill.ca

Living people
Academic staff of McGill University
McGill University alumni
Fellows of the Canadian Academy of Health Sciences
Alumni of University College London
Canadian people of British descent
Canadian dentists
Year of birth missing (living people)